Phoenix American is a privately held financial services and technology company headquartered in San Rafael, California. It is the parent of Phoenix American Financial Services, PAFS Ireland, Ltd, SalesFocus Solutions, and Phoenix Cable, Inc.

History

Origins

Phoenix American was founded in 1972 by Gus Constantin as the sponsor of a series of limited partnership investment funds for the leasing of business equipment (Phoenix Leasing). Four subsidiaries developed from the business sectors of Phoenix Leasing: Phoenix American Financial Services (fund administration, investor services and asset-backed securitization (ABS) managing agent services), SalesFocus Solutions (CRM, sales reporting and 22c-2 compliance services), Phoenix Leasing Portfolio Services (commercial lease portfolio management), and Phoenix Cable (cable television services). The company was publicly traded from 1982 until 1990. Gus Constantin is the president, chairman of the board and chief executive officer of the company and all its subsidiaries.

Current status

Phoenix American is headquartered in San Rafael, CA with regional offices in Phoenix, AZ, Bedford, New Hampshire, Shannon, Ireland, Hyderabad, India, and Guantanamo Bay, Cuba. Phoenix American Financial Services is a Securities and Exchange Commission registered provider of transfer agent services for alternative investment companies. The Phoenix American aviation ABS group provides managing agent and fund accounting services to asset-backed securitizations in the aviation leasing industry. SalesFocus Solutions provides customer relationship management (CRM), sales reporting and 22c-2 compliance to banks, insurance companies and asset management firms. Phoenix Leasing Portfolio Services, Inc. provides commercial lease portfolio management services for banks and other financial institutions. Phoenix Cable provides cable television services to the United States Navy.

Products and services

The STAR-XMS Transfer Agent System

The Syndication Tracking and Reporting (STAR) system, with Expanded Marketing and Sales (XMS) capabilities, is an integrated shareholder record keeping, transfer agent and sales reporting application for alternative investment firms.

Fund Administration Services

Phoenix American Financial Services performs full-service fund administration, fund accounting, transfer agent and outsourced back-office services for alternative investment fund companies.

Aviation ABS Managing Agent Services

Phoenix American provides managing agent and fund accounting services for asset-backed securitizations (ABS) in the commercial aircraft leasing industry. The company's wholly owned subsidiary, PAFS Ireland, Ltd., based in Shannon, Ireland provides services for clients who require a presence that jurisdiction.

The MARS CRM/Sales Reporting/Compliance System
The Marketing and Reporting Sales (MARS) system, is an integrated Customer Relationship Management (CRM), sales and marketing reporting and 22c-2 compliance application designed for asset management firms.

Data Stewardship Services
SalesFocus Solutions performs data reconciliation, scrubbing, and de-duping services for client sales and asset data.

Cable Television Services

Phoenix Cable is the provider of cable television services to the United States Naval Base at Guantanamo Bay, Cuba.

References

External links 
 New Brand Image - Yahoo Finance
 New Client: LaSalle Investment Management - Business Insider
 Airline Economics Magazine Names John McInerney '2020 Future Leader of the Year' - Aviation News
 Partnership with Foreside Financial Group - Yahoo Money
 Foreside Partner Spotlight: SalesFocus Solutions
 Company Profile - Bloomberg
 Natixis Selects SalesFocus - Finextra
 FinTech and Asset Management - NASDAQ
 Aviation ABS Group: 2020 Year in Review - MarketWatch

Financial services companies of the United States
Companies based in San Rafael, California